American singer Ava Max has released two studio albums, two extended plays, 23 singles (including six as a featured artist), nine promotional singles and 24 music videos, as well as 4 visualizer music videos. In 2008, Max released an independent extended play on her Myspace profile titled Amanda Kay. She released "Take Away the Pain" under the stage name Ava in 2013, which was later produced by the Canadian duo Project 46 in 2015.

After signing with Atlantic Records in 2016, Max released her debut single "My Way" in April 2018, and collaborated with Gashi on a song titled "Slippin'". "Sweet but Psycho" was released in August 2018, which became Max's breakthrough hit, reaching number one in 22 countries including Sweden, Finland, Norway and the United Kingdom. It reached the top of the Billboard Dance Club Songs chart in January 2019, and charted at number 10 on the Billboard Hot 100.

Max's next single "So Am I" was released in March 2019, which charted in the top 10 in Poland, Norway, Scotland, and Sweden. Two promotional singles were released titled "Blood, Sweat & Tears" and "Freaking Me Out", which were followed by her next single "Torn" in August 2019. "Salt" was sent to digital streaming platforms in December 2019. In 2020, Max released "Kings & Queens", "Who's Laughing Now" and "OMG What's Happening" as singles from her debut studio album Heaven & Hell, which was released in September 2020. "My Head & My Heart" was released in November 2020, which was included on the digital edition of the aforementioned album.

Studio albums

Extended plays

Compilation extended plays

Singles

As lead artist

As featured artist

Promotional singles

Other charted songs

Guest appearances

Videography

Notes

References

Discography
Discographies of American artists
Electronic music discographies
Pop music discographies